Lucelle is a commune in the Haut-Rhin department in Alsace in north-eastern France.

The commune comprises the French part of the hamlet of Lucelle, the other part being part of Pleigne, in the Swiss Canton of Jura.

Geography

Climate
Lucelle has a oceanic climate (Köppen climate classification Cfb).

See also

 Lucelle Abbey
 Communes of the Haut-Rhin département

References

Communes of Haut-Rhin